Tara A. Smith (born 1961) is an American philosopher. She is a professor of philosophy, the BB&T Chair for the Study of Objectivism, and the Anthem Foundation Fellow for the Study of Objectivism at the University of Texas at Austin.

Career
Smith specializes in moral and political theory. She did her undergraduate work at the University of Virginia and received her doctorate from Johns Hopkins University. Her published works include the books Viable Values: A Study of Life as the Root and Reward of Morality (2000), Moral Rights and Political Freedom (1995), and Ayn Rand's Normative Ethics: The Virtuous Egoist (2006). She is also a contributing author to several essay collections about Ayn Rand's novels. Smith has written in journals such as The Journal of Philosophy, American Philosophical Quarterly, Social Philosophy and Policy, and Law and Philosophy.

Smith has lectured all across the United States including Harvard University, Wheeling Jesuit University, Duke University, University of Pittsburgh, and New York University, and to groups of businessmen. She has also organized conferences, often ones emphasizing objective law.

She is on the board of The Philosopher's Index and is on the Academic Advisory Council of The Clemson Institute for the Study of Capitalism at Clemson University. Smith is a member of the Ayn Rand Society, which exists within the American Philosophical Association. She is also on the board of directors of the Ayn Rand Institute.

Selected publications

Books

Articles
 
 
 
 
 
 
 
 
 
 "'Social' Objectivity and the Objectivity of Value" in 
 
 "Forbidding Life to Those Still Living" in 
 "Independence in The Fountainhead" in 
 
 
 "'Humanity's Darkest Evil': The Lethal Destructiveness of Non-Objective Law" in

See also
 American philosophy
 List of American philosophers

References

External links
 Faculty page at University of Texas at Austin Department of Philosophy
 Academic review of Ayn Rand's Normative Ethics: The Virtuous Egoist
 The Objective Standard's review of Ayn Rand's Normative Ethics: The Virtuous Egoist
 Carrie-Ann Biondi, Review of "Ayn Rand's Normative Ethics: The Virtuous Egoist" Reason Papers 30 (2008)
 Page at the Ayn Rand Institute which lists her books and some articles
 Archive of Tara Smith's articles at the Capitalism Magazine website

1961 births
Living people
20th-century American philosophers
21st-century American philosophers
American political philosophers
Objectivism scholars
Objectivists
University of Virginia alumni
Johns Hopkins University alumni
University of Texas at Austin faculty
American atheists
Atheist philosophers
American women philosophers
Ayn Rand Institute
21st-century American women